Waldeck is a Canadian dispersed rural community located in Annapolis County, Nova Scotia. Nearby are the communities of Waldeck East and Waldeck West.

It was settled after the American Revolution by disbanded German troops (Hessians)  from the Principality of Waldeck who had fought on the British side during the war.

References

Communities in Annapolis County, Nova Scotia